Love Theme from "The Godfather" is the twenty-ninth studio album by American pop singer Andy Williams, released on March 21, 1972, by Columbia Records.  The two new songs on what was otherwise another LP of covers of hits by other artists were the title track and "Music from Across the Way", which came from the songwriters behind his recent hits "Happy Heart" (composer James Last) and "(Where Do I Begin) Love Story" (lyricist Carl Sigman).

The album made its first appearance on Billboard magazine's Top LP's & Tapes chart in the issue dated April 8, 1972, and remained on the album chart for 26 weeks, peaking at number 29. It entered the UK album chart three months later, on July 29, and reached number 11 over the course of 16 weeks. One month later, on August 29, it received Gold certification from the Recording Industry Association of America.

The first song on the album to be released as a single was "Music from Across the Way", which entered Billboard'''s list of the 40 most popular Easy Listening songs of the week in the US in the issue dated January 29, 1972, and stayed on the chart for four weeks, eventually peaking at number 30.  The album's title song (subtitled "Speak Softly Love") entered that same chart three months later, on April 8, for its first of 12 weeks, during which time it reached number seven. It also entered the Billboard Hot 100 in the April 8 issue and spent 11 weeks there, where it made it to number 34.  The song debuted on the UK singles chart four months later, on August 5, and got as high as number 42 over a nine-week period. The next single, "MacArthur Park", "bubbled under" the Hot 100 for four weeks that began in the August 5, 1972, issue and reached number 102.  It also debuted on the Easy Listening chart in that same issue and made it to number 26 there over the course of five weeks.Love Theme from "The Godfather" was released on compact disc for the first time as one of two albums on one CD by Collectables Records on January 22, 2002, the other album being Williams's Columbia release from the spring of 1974, The Way We Were.  Collectables included this CD in a box set entitled Classic Album Collection, Vol. 2, which contains 15 of his studio albums and two compilations and was released on November 29, 2002.

ReceptionBillboard magazine praised the album. "A superb performance from Andy Williams and top production work by Dick Glasser make this a very special LP that is going to take Williams high up the charts once again."

Track listing

Side one
 "Speak Softly Love (Love Theme from 'The Godfather')" (Larry Kusik, Nino Rota) – 3:05
 "Precious and Few" (Walter Nims) – 2:54
 "Theme from 'Summer of 42'" from Summer of '42 (Alan Bergman, Marilyn Bergman, Michel Legrand) – 3:20
 "Everything I Own" (David Gates) – 3:22
 "Until It's Time for You to Go" (Buffy Sainte-Marie) – 3:44
 "An Old Fashioned Love Song" (Paul Williams) – 3:03

Side two
 "MacArthur Park" (Jimmy Webb) – 5:03
 "Hurting Each Other" (Gary Geld, Peter Udell) – 2:55
 "Music from Across the Way" (James Last, Carl Sigman) – 3:45
 "Without You" (Tom Evans, Peter Ham) – 3:16
 "Imagine" (John Lennon) – 3:22

Recording dates
From the liner notes for the 2002 CD:

January 4, 1971 – "MacArthur Park"
April 22, 1971 – "Music from Across the Way"
January 19, 1972 – "Theme from 'Summer of 42'", "An Old Fashioned Love Song", "Hurting Each Other"
February 1, 1972 – "Precious and Few", "Everything I Own", "Without You"
February 18, 1972 – "Speak Softly Love (Love Theme from 'The Godfather')", "Until It's Time for You to Go", "Imagine"

Song information

Al Martino was close behind Williams with his recording of "Speak Softly Love (Love Theme from 'The Godfather')", beginning his chart run with the song in the Billboard'' issue dated April 29, 1972, just three weeks after Williams's version debuted, and reaching number 80 on the Hot 100 and number 24 on the Easy Listening chart. Climax made it to number three on the Hot 100 and number six Easy Listening with "Precious and Few". "Theme from 'Summer of 42'" peaked at number 21 pop and number six Easy Listening as an instrumental by pianist Peter Nero. Bread took the song "Everything I Own" to number five on the Hot 100, number three Easy Listening, and number 32 on the UK singles chart. Elvis Presley had the most successful rendition of "Until It's Time for You to Go", which got as high as number 40 pop, number nine Easy Listening, number 68 Country, and number five in the UK.

"An Old Fashioned Love Song" by Three Dog Night reached number four on the Hot 100, spent a week at number one on the Easy Listening chart, and received Gold certification from the Recording Industry Association of America. Actor Richard Harris had the most chart success with "MacArthur Park" by the time this album was recorded, reaching number two pop, number 10 Easy Listening, and number four in the UK, but Grammys for the song went to the Ray Charles Singers in the category of Best Contemporary Pop Performance by a Chorus and Waylon Jennings and The Kimberlys in the category of Best Country Vocal Performance by a Duo or Group.

The Carpenters and their version of "Hurting Each Other" spent two weeks at number two pop and two weeks at number one Easy Listening in addition to receiving Gold certification from the Recording Industry Association of America. "Without You" by Nilsson had four weeks at number one pop, and five weeks at number one on the Easy Listening and UK singles charts, and his recording also received Gold certification and earned him a Grammy for Best Pop Vocal Performance, Male. By the time Williams released this album, John Lennon's "Imagine" had peaked at number three on the Hot 100 and number seven on the Easy Listening chart.

Personnel
From the liner notes for the original album:

Andy Williams – vocals
Dick Glasser – producer
Al Capps – arranger (except where noted)
Artie Butler – arranger ("Theme from 'Summer of 42'", "Everything I Own", "MacArthur Park")
Ernie Freeman – arranger ("Music from Across the Way")
Eric Prestidge – engineer
Peter Romano – engineer
Rafael O. Valentin – engineer
Ivan Nagy – front cover photo
Keats Tyler – back cover photo

References

Bibliography

1972 albums
Andy Williams albums
Albums produced by Dick Glasser
Columbia Records albums